Falco F.C., commonly known as the Holyoke Falcos, was an American soccer club based in Holyoke, Massachusetts, that was a founding member of the professional American Soccer League, but withdrew at the end of the first season. The team was sponsored by the Farr Alpaca Company, a local textile mill.

Year-by-year

External links
 Team Photo
 The Year in American Soccer - 1922

Sports in Holyoke, Massachusetts
Defunct soccer clubs in Massachusetts
American Soccer League (1921–1933) teams
Works soccer clubs in the United States